Newbridge-on-Wye Football Club are a currently inactive football club in mid-Wales.

The home colours are white shirts with black shorts and socks.

History

The team's greatest success was during the 2004–05 season when they won the Mid Wales South League. The football club applied for promotion and this was granted in the next season following extensive work to their Penybont ground in order to meet the standards set by the FAW. During the 2005–06 season, their first in the Spar Mid Wales League, they placed 12th.

They had been due to play in the Mid Wales Football League in the new East Division for the 2020–21 season, but the season was declared void due to the Coronavirus pandemic. They withdrew from the league ahead of the 2021–22 season. The team noted that they hoped to be able to compete in the Mid Wales South League after at least one year away.

Honours

Mid Wales South Football League - Champions: 2004–05

References 

Mid Wales Football League clubs
Sport in Powys
Mid Wales South League clubs
Football clubs in Wales
1988 establishments in Wales
Association football clubs established in 1988